is a railway station on the Sanyo Main Line in Fukuyama, Hiroshima Prefecture, Japan, operated by West Japan Railway Company (JR West).

Lines
Bingo-Akasaka Station is served by the Sanyo Main Line.

Station layout
The station consists of one side platform and one island platform serving three tracks. The station has a "Midori no Madoguchi" staffed ticket office.

Adjacent stations

History
The station opened on 5 June 1916.

See also
 List of railway stations in Japan

References

External links

 JR West station information 

Railway stations in Hiroshima Prefecture
Sanyō Main Line
Stations of West Japan Railway Company
Railway stations in Japan opened in 1916